The Vice-Chamberlain of the Household is a member of the Royal Household of the Sovereign of the United Kingdom. The officeholder is usually a senior government whip in the British House of Commons ranking third or fourth after the Chief Whip and the Deputy Chief Whip. The Vice-Chamberlain is the Deputy to the Lord Chamberlain of the Household and, like the Lord Chamberlain, carries a white staff of office when on duty on state occasions. 

The Vice-Chamberlain's main roles are to compile a daily private report to the Sovereign on proceedings in the House of Commons and to relay addresses from the Commons to the Sovereign and back. As a member of the Royal Household, the Vice-Chamberlain accompanies the Sovereign and Royal Household at certain diplomatic and social events, particularly the annual garden party at Buckingham Palace. When the Sovereign goes in procession to Westminster for the State Opening of Parliament, the Vice-Chamberlain stays and is "held captive" at Buckingham Palace. This custom began with the Restoration (1660), because of the previous parliament's role in the beheading of Charles I. During their captivity the Vice-Chamberlain is offered a choice of champagne or sherry to drink by the Lord Chamberlain as they watch the State Opening of Parliament on television.

During the latter part of her reign, the Vice-Chamberlain sent a daily email to Elizabeth II. The Queen was regarded as well informed about British political affairs as she typically read daily newspapers and was a listener of the Today programme on BBC Radio 4. The late queen's private secretary told Andrew MacKay, who held the post in 1996, to include more "gossip and the inside track" as his initial efforts had been "rather stilted". MacKay turned his efforts into a "who's up, who's down" for the queen. Anne Milton, who held the post in 2014 and 2015, looked for things that "might amuse" the queen and to "give a bit of colour" to the proceedings in the House of Commons. The Queen reportedly told Jim Fitzpatrick, who held the post of Vice-Chamberlain between 2003 and 2005 to send her news which "doesn't make the press" and that he felt encouraged to be "frank and transparent" with her due to the privacy of their communications. Emails began to be sent to the Queen at Buckingham Palace in 2014; the dispatches had previously been collected by a messenger.

Notable holders of the office include Sir George Carteret, Lord Hervey, the Earl of Harrington, the Earl Spencer, Michael Stewart and Bernard Weatherill.

List of Vice-Chamberlains of the Household

List of Shadow Vice-Chamberlains of the Household 

 Jessica Morden was appointed the first shadow in 2020.

References

Chamberlain of the Household
Positions within the British Royal Household